Rodrigo Oreamuno Blanco (born 28 July 1939) is a Costa Rican politician and lawyer who was First Vice President of Costa Rica between 1994 and 1998, serving under president José María Figueres. In the 2018 elections, he endorsed the candidate Carlos Alvarado Quesada of the Citizens' Action Party.

References

Living people
1939 births
Costa Rican politicians
University of Costa Rica alumni